is a group of islands in Miyagi Prefecture, Japan.  There are some 260 tiny islands (shima) covered in pines (matsu) – hence the name – and it is considered to be one of the Three Views of Japan.

Nearby cultural properties include Zuigan-ji, Entsū-in, Kanrantei, and the Satohama shell mound.

Views

A well-known haiku describes the islands as so striking that the poet is at a loss for words:

While often attributed to Matsuo Bashō, the earliest known publication is in the Matsushima Zushi (松島図誌),  published in 1820 over a century after Bashō's death, which attributes it to the kyōka poet Tawara-bō (田原坊).  While Bashō did visit Matsushima in Oku no Hosomichi, its only haiku about Matsushima was written by his travel comparison Kawai Sora.

Four views of Matsushima

Cruise
Tourists can view the islands from up close on cruise boats.

Transportation

The town is only a short distance (thirty minutes, about 14 km) from prefectural capital Sendai and is easily accessible by train.  Matsushima-Kaigan Station is near the attractions such as Zuiganji and the waterfront.  Matsushima Station, on a separate line is on the opposite side of the town.

2011 Tōhoku earthquake
Despite the proximity of Matsushima to the 2011 Tōhoku earthquake and tsunami, the area was protected by the islands and suffered relatively little damage.  The initial tsunami was 3.2 metres (10.5 feet) with the second 3.8 metres (12.5 feet). Electricity was restored by March 18, water fully restored by April 16th and the Senseki Train Line between Takagimachi Station and Sendai by May 28. Nevertheless, three people were confirmed killed in Matsushima (including by aftershocks) with 18 killed while out of town.

Activities 
Around the island travelers can go on a cruise and view the islands up close an around the Matsushima shore travelers can rent bikes.

See also
List of Special Places of Scenic Beauty, Special Historic Sites and Special Natural Monuments

References

External links

 Matsushima Town official website

9900

Tourist attractions in Miyagi Prefecture
Special Places of Scenic Beauty
Archipelagoes of Japan
Japanese archipelago
Islands of Miyagi Prefecture
Archipelagoes of the Pacific Ocean